This is a list of museums or print rooms with major collections of European old master prints and drawings. This list is incomplete, and should not be regarded as a correct ranking of the major collections.

 British Museum, London, England
 50,000 drawings, 2 million prints
 The Metropolitan Museum of Art *, New York, US
 15,000 drawings, 1.5 million prints
 Albertina, Vienna, Austria
 50,000 drawings, 1 million prints Excludes 25,000 architectural drawings
 Kupferstichkabinett, Berlin, Germany
 110,000 drawings, 500,000 prints
 Royal Library of Belgium, Brussels, Belgium
 Over 20,000 drawings and 700,000 prints
 State Hermitage, St. Petersburg, Russia
 39,000 drawings, 486,000 prints
 Victoria & Albert Museum, London, England
 2,000 drawings, 500,000 prints Excludes 600,000 architectural drawings, 100,000 design drawings and 10,000 British drawings  (V&A Collecting Plan Including Acquisition & Disposal Policy, August 2004)
 Rijksmuseum, Amsterdam, Netherlands
 Over 500,000 prints and drawings
 National Gallery in Prague, Collection of Prints and Drawings, Prague, Czech Republic
 60,000 drawings, 400,000 prints
 Cabinet des estampes et des dessins, Strasbourg, France
 Over 200,000 prints and drawings 
 Fitzwilliam Museum, Cambridge, England
 20,000 drawings, 180,000 prints
 Royal Collection, London, England
 40,000 drawings, 150,000 prints Including 600 drawings by Leonardo da Vinci
 Musée du Louvre, Paris, France
 140,500 drawings, 43,000 prints The main print collection is at the Bibliothèque nationale de France.
 Philadelphia Museum of Art, Philadelphia, US
 150,000 drawings and prints
Uffizi, Florence, Italy
 120,000 drawings and prints
National Gallery of Art, Washington, US
 105,000 drawings and prints
Bibliothèque de l'Arsenal, Paris, France
 100,000 prints
 Art Institute of Chicago, Chicago, US
 11,500 drawings, 60,000 prints
Musée des Beaux-Arts, Dijon, France
 10,500 drawings, 60,0000 prints
Musée des Beaux-Arts, Orléans, France
 10,000 drawings, 50,000 prints
 Museum of Modern Art, New York, US
 6,000 drawings, 50,000 prints
 Brooklyn Museum, New York, US
 2,000 drawings, 40,000 prints
Museo del Prado, Madrid, Spain
 9,000 drawings, 6,000 prints. The main drawing and print collection is at the Biblioteca Nacional de España.
Zelandia Illustrata, Amsterdam, Netherlands
18,000 maps, prints, drawings, photographs, glass negatives, slides and postcards
Museo ABC de Dibujo e Ilustración, Madrid, Spain    
 200,000 drawings and illustrations by 1,500 artists from 1891 up to the present
Museum Boijmans van Beuningen, Rotterdam, The Netherlands
 17,000 drawings, 60,000 to 70,000 prints
Hamburger Kunsthalle, Hamburg, Germany
 130,000 prints and drawings
Teylers Museum Haarlem, The Netherlands
Städel Museum, Frankfurt am Main, Germany
 100,000 prints and drawings
Museum of Fine Arts Budapest, Budapest, Hungary
 100,000 prints, 10,000 drawings 
National Art Museum of Catalonia, Barcelona, Spain
 50,000 drawings, 70,000 prints
Royal Academy of Fine Arts of San Fernando, Madrid, Spain
 15,300 drawings, 35,000 prints
Hispanic Society of America, New York, US
 6,000 drawings, 15,000 prints
Plantin-Moretus Museum, Antwerp, Belgium
 75,000 drawings and prints

References

Major Collections Of European Prints And Drawings
Drawings
Prints (art)
European art